At the 1896 Summer Olympics, six cycling events were contested at the Neo Phaliron Velodrome.  They were organized and prepared by the Sub-Committee for Cycling.  Events were held on 8 April, 11 April, 12 April and 13 April 1896.  Nineteen cyclists, all men, from five nations competed.

Medal summary
These medals were retroactively assigned by the International Olympic Committee; at the time, winners were given a silver medal and subsequent places received no award.  Every nation won at least a silver medal, with three winning golds.

Participating nations

A total of 19 cyclists from five nations competed at the Athens Games:

 
 
 
 
 (*)

(*) NOTE: Including one cyclist (Nikos Loverdos) from Smyrna who competed for Greece.

Medal table

Sub-Committee for Cycling
 Nicolas Vlangalis, president
 Const. Bellinis, secretary
 S. Mavros
 Nic. Kontojiannis
 Mar Philipp
 Jac. Theophilas

See also
List of Olympic medalists in cycling (men)
List of Olympic medalists in cycling (women)

References

External links
  (Digitally available at )
  (Excerpt available at )
 

 
1896 Summer Olympics events
1896
1896 in cycle racing
International cycle races hosted by Greece